Robert "Rob" Rumfeldt (born February 18, 1966 in Windsor, Ontario) is a Canadian curler from Guelph, Ontario. Rumfeldt was a member of the 1996 Ontario provincial championship team, when he played second for Bob Ingram. As of 2013, Rumfeldt has played in eight provincial championships.

A longtime second, Rumfeldt began skipping his own team for the 2009-10 season.

In addition to winning the 1996 provincial men's championship, Rumfeldt has also won the 1994 provincial mixed championship (with Ingram) and the 1994 Silver Tankard.

1996 Brier
Rumfeldt won the provincial championship in 1996, playing second for Bob Ingram's Ridgetown Curling Club rink which also consisted of Larry Smyth (third) and James Brackett (lead).  It was Rumfeldt's only provincial title out of seven provincial championship appearances (as of 2010). The team finished with a record of 4-7, in 10th place, one of the worst records ever for Ontario. Rumfeldt played a respectable 80%, third among seconds.

External links
 

Curlers from Ontario
1966 births
Sportspeople from Windsor, Ontario
Sportspeople from Guelph
Living people
Canadian male curlers